Natalia "Nati" Sánchez Echeverri (born May 20, 1983) is a Colombian recurve archer. She is a two-time Olympian, contesting the 2008 and 2016 Games, a World Championship bronze medalist, and a two-time Pan American champion in the women's team event. Sánchez was born in Medellín, Antioquia.

Career

Olympic Games
At the 2008 Summer Olympics in Beijing, Sánchez finished her ranking round with a total of 643 points. This gave her the 18th seed for the final competition bracket in which she faced Katsiarina Muliuk in the first round. Despite the archer from Belarus being only the 47th seed, she managed to upset Sánchez and eliminate her with a 104-101 score. Together with Ana Rendón and Sigrid Romero she also took part in the team event. With her 643 score from the ranking round combined with the 647 of Rendón and the 551 of Romero the Colombian team was in tenth position after the ranking round. In the first round they faced the Japanese team, but were unable to beat them. Japan advanced to the quarter finals with a 206-199 score.

Sanchez also represented Colombia at the 2016 Summer Olympics in Rio de Janeiro.

Pan American Games
Sánchez achieved a gold medal in the women's team event at the 2007 Pan American Games alongside Ana Rendón and Sigrid Romero, Colombia's first gold medal in the event at the Games. She did not compete in the 2011 Games four years later due to a dispute between Sánchez, Rendón, and Romero and the Colombian national coach Kim Hag Yong. Following the archers' lack of confidence in Kim's training methods and their refusal to work with him, the three were withdrawn from the Games by the Colombian Olympic Committee.

References

External links
 

1983 births
Living people
Colombian female archers
Olympic archers of Colombia
Archers at the 2007 Pan American Games
Archers at the 2008 Summer Olympics
Archers at the 2016 Summer Olympics
People from Medellín
World Archery Championships medalists
Pan American Games gold medalists for Colombia
Pan American Games medalists in archery
Archers at the 2015 Pan American Games
Central American and Caribbean Games silver medalists for Colombia
Central American and Caribbean Games bronze medalists for Colombia
Competitors at the 2006 Central American and Caribbean Games
South American Games gold medalists for Colombia
South American Games medalists in archery
Competitors at the 2014 South American Games
Central American and Caribbean Games medalists in archery
Medalists at the 2015 Pan American Games
20th-century Colombian women
21st-century Colombian women